Andrzej Zygmunt Trajda (born 20 November 1942) is a Polish former sport shooter who competed in the 1972 Summer Olympics and in the 1976 Summer Olympics.

References

1942 births
Living people
Polish male sport shooters
ISSF rifle shooters
Olympic shooters of Poland
Shooters at the 1972 Summer Olympics
Shooters at the 1976 Summer Olympics
People from Otwock
Sportspeople from Masovian Voivodeship